Commonwealth Avenue Historic District may refer to:
 Commonwealth Avenue Historic District (Newton, Massachusetts), on the National Register of Historic Places (NRHP)
 Commonwealth Avenue Historic District (North Attleborough, Massachusetts), on the NRHP

See also
Commonwealth (disambiguation)
Commonwealth Avenue (disambiguation)
Commonwealth Club Historic District, Richmond, Virginia